Diane St-Jacques (born May 16, 1953) is a Canadian businessperson and former politician. St-Jacques served in the House of Commons of Canada from 1997 to 2004.

History
St-Jacques was born in Granby, Quebec. She was a promotional coordinator for Agropur in Granby and an advertising consultant for a radio station in Sherbrooke. St-Jacques was involved in the community in a variety of volunteer roles. Involved in politics since 1979, St-Jacques first stood for office in the 1997 federal election as the Progressive Conservative candidate for Shefford. With Sherbrooke's Jean Charest as a national leader, the party experienced a resurgence in Quebec's Eastern Townships, and St-Jacques was elected to the House of Commons, taking her seat from the Bloc Québécois.

Until she left the PC caucus, she was its designated parliamentary critic for International Cooperation, La Francophonie, and children and youth. She was also identified as the PC "family critic."

In 1999, St-Jacques joined MPs Svend Robinson (NDP) and Réal Ménard (Bloc), both openly gay, and Toronto Liberal MP Bill Graham, in a "pink caucus" across party lines. The group advocated that the legal definition of spouse include same-sex couples. The social conservative Campaign Life Coalition decried St.-Jacques as "a married mother of one, who says she isn't a lesbian but who supports the gay agenda."

St-Jacques spoke in Parliament in favour of medical marijuana rights.

In April 1998, Charest left federal politics to seek the leadership of the Quebec Liberal Party, and Tory support in Quebec declined under Joe Clark's leadership. On September 12, 2000, with an election increasingly close, St-Jacques, with fellow Tory MP David Price and independent, formerly Tory MP André Harvey, joined the Liberal Party of Canada and the Liberal caucus. St-Jacques and Price reportedly told Clark they would leave the party months earlier.

In the 2000 election, St-Jacques retained her Shefford seat as a Liberal.

She served as Parliamentary Secretary to the Minister of Human Resources Development in the government of prime minister Jean Chrétien from January 13 until December 11, 2003, and as Deputy Government Whip under Chrétien's successor Paul Martin from February 2, 2004, until she left office.

In the 2004 federal election, she lost her seat to Robert Vincent of the Bloc Québécois. She ran again in the 2006 federal election, placing third place behind Vincent and the Conservative candidate Jean Lambert. She received 23.4% of all votes cast.

References

External links
 

1953 births
Women members of the House of Commons of Canada
Liberal Party of Canada MPs
Living people
Members of the House of Commons of Canada from Quebec
People from Granby, Quebec
Progressive Conservative Party of Canada MPs
21st-century Canadian politicians
21st-century Canadian women politicians